Nigel Robert Badnell is a British physicist, currently at University of Strathclyde and an Elected Fellow of the American Physical Society.

References

Living people
British physicists
People associated with the University of Strathclyde
Fellows of the American Physical Society
Year of birth missing (living people)
Place of birth missing (living people)
Alumni of University College, Durham